Palawania is a genus of fungi in the Parmulariaceae family.

Species
As accepted by Species Fungorum;
 Palawania cocoes 
 Palawania grandis 
 Palawania thailandensis 

Former species; (all Parmulariaceae family)
 P. brosimi  = Palawaniella brosimi
 P. dovyalidis  = Inocyclus dovyalidis
 P. eucleae  = Palawaniella orbiculata
 P. halleriae  = Palawaniella halleriae
 P. orbiculata  = Palawaniella orbiculata

References

External links
Index Fungorum

Microthyriales